The Rabnitz is a river in eastern Austria and northwestern Hungary.

The Rabnitz is formed at the confluence of its two headstreams Spratzbach and Thalbach near Hollenthon in Lower Austria. It flows towards the east through Burgenland, and enters Hungary (Győr-Moson-Sopron County) near Répcevis. It receives the Hanság-főcsatorna, the canal that drains the Neusiedler See, from the left. It discharges into the Moson branch of the Danube near Győr.

References

Rivers of Lower Austria
Rivers of Burgenland
Rivers of Austria
Rivers of Hungary